Kulthum or Kulsum is an Arabic female given name. It means, "someone with a chubby face" or someone who comprehend people . It is feminized as "Umm Kulthum" (Kulthum's mother).

People who had this name:
Umm Kulthum
Kalsoom Nawaz Sharif, the wife of 12th Prime minister of Pakistan, Nawaz Sharif
Kalsoom Perveen, a Pakistani Politician and a Member of Senate of Pakistan
Kulsoom Abdullah, a Pakistan American weightlifter
Kulsum Zamani Begum (1832-1902), Indian princess, daughter of Bahadur Shah Zafar the last Mughal Emperor of India
Kulsum Begum, builder of the Kulsum Begum Masjid, 17th-century princess of the Golconda Sultanate in southern India
People using it in their matronymic/patronymic or surname include:
Amr ibn Kulthum

See also
Umm Kulthum (name)
Kalsoom
Kulthum (crater), on Mercury
Arabic name

References

Arabic feminine given names